Luteibacter anthropi is a bacterium from the genus of Luteibacter which has been isolated from human blood of a child from Göteborg in Sweden.

References

Xanthomonadales
Bacteria described in 2009